Joseph Turpin is a Canadian former international soccer player. He won one cap for Canada in 1975. Turpin is a member of the Newfoundland and Labrador Soccer Association Hall of Fame. He attended the University of New Brunswick.

References

Year of birth missing (living people)
Living people
Canadian soccer players
Canada men's international soccer players
Soccer people from Newfoundland and Labrador
University of New Brunswick alumni
Association footballers not categorized by position